The 1905 Holy Cross football team was an American football team that represented the College of the Holy Cross as an independent in the 1905 college football season.

In their third year under head coach Frank Cavanaugh, the team compiled a 2–5–2 record. George S.L. Connor was the team captain.

According to college records, Holy Cross played all of its home games at the newly renamed Fitton Field baseball stadium on the college campus in Worcester, Massachusetts. Contemporary reports suggest that one of the home games, the crosstown rivalry game with WPI, was played at the team's former home stadium off campus, the Worcester Oval.

Schedule

References

Holy Cross
Holy Cross Crusaders football seasons
Holy Cross football